This is the solo discography of Scottish musician Midge Ure.

Albums

Studio albums

Live albums

Soundtrack albums

Compilation albums

Video albums

Singles

Other appearances
 "The Man Who Sold the World" on Party Party soundtrack (1982)
 "Baby Little One" on Lullabies with a Difference by various artists (1998)
 "Something to Remind Me" on Tripomatic Fairytales 3003 by Jam & Spoon (2003)
 "Smile" on Colour by Andy Hunter (2008)
 "Let It Rise" on Atemlos by Schiller (2010)
 "Taking Back My Time" on International Blue by Stephen Emmer (2014)
 "Endless Moments" on Lichtmond 3: Days of Eternity by Lichtmond (2014)
 "Pure" on Conchita by Conchita Wurst (2015)
 "Touching Hearts and Skies" on Fly (Songs Inspired by the Film Eddie the Eagle) (2016)
 "Glorious" on Welcome to the Dancefloor by Rusty Egan (2017)

Notes

References

Discographies of British artists
Pop music discographies
Rock music discographies
New wave discographies